Deepak Colundalur Ananthapadmanabha is an online journalist and comedian based in New York City who hosted "The Circuit", a weekly online show on MOJO HD.  Deepak is a high school art teacher and co-host of the stand up/music showcase AbeMixture, which occurs monthly at Pacific Standard bar in Park Slope, Brooklyn. He is also the voice of the announcer on Baking W/ Mercury.

Education 
From 1993 to 1998 Ananthapadmanabha attended the University of Massachusetts Amherst, earning a B.A. in Communications. In 2006 he received his M.S. in Art and Design Education from Pratt Institute.

Show on MOJO HD 
Ananthapadmanabha hosted "The Circuit" on MOJO HD. The show began in early 2008. The show takes informative coverage of events in technology and entertainment and mixes it with bits of comedy. " it’s your proverbial bus ride through the tunnel of gadgetry, it’s your hilarious and informative lunch break" Like other online shows, for example Rocket Boom, the show covers cutting-edge developments in the digital world but does so with a light touch.

References

External links 
 MOJO's biography

21st-century American comedians
American stand-up comedians
American comedians of Indian descent
American male journalists
American writers of Indian descent
American male comedians
American Internet celebrities
Pratt Institute alumni
University of Massachusetts Amherst College of Social and Behavioral Sciences alumni
Living people
Year of birth missing (living people)